Kevin Curren and David Pate were the defending champions but only Pate competed that year with Jeremy Bates.

Bates and Pate lost in the first round to John Fitzgerald and Todd Witsken.

Luke Jensen and Richey Reneberg won in the final 6–0, 6–4 against Kelly Jones and Joey Rive.

Seeds

  Pieter Aldrich /  Danie Visser (semifinals)
  John Fitzgerald /  Todd Witsken (quarterfinals)
  Martin Davis /  Scott Davis (first round)
  Neil Broad /  Gary Muller (quarterfinals)

Draw

External links
 1989 South African Open Doubles Draw

Doubles